Aleksandr Veniaminovich Abushakhmetov (21 July 1954 – 10 June 1996) was a Soviet fencer. He won a bronze medal in the team épée event at the 1980 Summer Olympics.

References

External links
 

1954 births
1996 deaths
Kyrgyzstani male épée fencers
Soviet male épée fencers
Olympic fencers of the Soviet Union
Fencers at the 1976 Summer Olympics
Fencers at the 1980 Summer Olympics
Olympic bronze medalists for the Soviet Union
Olympic medalists in fencing
Sportspeople from Bishkek
Medalists at the 1980 Summer Olympics